The following is a list of offshore wind farms in Germany, operational within the national maritime boundaries. Germany, along with Denmark and the United Kingdom is a worldwide leader in advancing offshore wind farm technology.
The name of the wind farm is the name used by the energy company when referring to the farm and is usually related to a shoal or the name of the nearest town on shore.



Offshore wind farms

Wind farms under construction

Projects

Gallery

See also 

Wind power in Germany
List of offshore wind farms
Lists of offshore wind farms by country
List of offshore wind farms in the North Sea
List of onshore wind farms

References

External links 
Deutsche Energie-Agentur (Dena), German Energy Agency
LORC Offshore Renewables Map - Germany
Capacity factors
Capacity Factors windparks germany in 2019

Official websites 

Germany